Ma Xingrui (born October 1959) is a Chinese politician and aerospace engineer who is the Communist Party secretary of Xinjiang. Prior to that, he had served as the Vice Minister of Industry and Information Technology, Head of the Political and Legal Affairs Commission of Guangdong, Communist Party Secretary of Shenzhen, Deputy Party Secretary of Guangdong, and Governor of Guangdong. Ma is a member of the Politburo of the Chinese Communist Party.

Ma is recognized as one of China's top scientists. He previously served as Vice President of Harbin Institute of Technology, General Manager of China Aerospace Science and Technology Corporation, Director of the China National Space Administration, and chief commander of Chang'e 3, China's first lunar exploration mission.

Education and academic career
Ma Xingrui was born in October 1959 in Shuangyashan, Heilongjiang province, to a family of mine workers in China's industrial northeast. His branch of the family migrated from Yuncheng County, Shandong to Shuangyashan in the 1930s during his grandfather's generation. He received a bachelor's degree at Fuxin Mining College (now Liaoning University of Technology) in 1982, and went on to graduate school for general mechanics at Tianjin University. He earned his doctorate in mechanics at Harbin Institute of Technology (HIT). He joined the Chinese Communist Party (CCP) in January 1988. He stayed at HIT to pursue post-doctoral work, and was named a professor in 1991. In April 1992 he became dean of the school of mechanics at the institute. In April 1996 he was named vice president of the institute.

Aerospace industry
In May 1996 Ma was appointed Vice-Dean of Chinese Academy of Space Technology (CAST), and became the leader and chief engineer of the Shijian 5 satellite project. In 1999 he was named deputy general manager of China Aerospace Science and Technology Corporation (CASC). In December 2003 he was additionally appointed Chairman of the Sino Satellite Communications Company and worked on various lunar missions. In September 2007, Ma was promoted to General Manager of CASC.

In 2013 Ma was appointed Director of the China National Space Administration, Director of the China Atomic Energy Authority, Director of the SASTIND, and Vice-Minister of Industry and Information Technology. He was the chief commander of the successful Chang'e 3 mission, China's first lunar surface exploration.

Political career
In 2012, Ma was elected as a full member of the 18th Central Committee of the Chinese Communist Party. In November 2013, Ma left his posts in the world of science and was transferred to Guangdong to serve as deputy party secretary of the province and concurrently the Secretary of the provincial Political and Legal Affairs Commission. In March 2015, he was named Communist Party Secretary of Shenzhen, replacing Wang Rong. Ma's appointment in Shenzhen placed him in his first executive party leadership role. His appointment also elevated the status of the office, given that his predecessor Wang is only an alternate member of the Central Committee, while Ma is a full member.

In December 2016, Ma was appointed as the acting Governor of Guangdong. In a break with tradition, Ma became the first governor in over 30 years to have not been native to the province. Ma was elected as the Governor of Guangdong on 23 January 2017. In October 2017, Ma was elected as a full member of the 19th Central Committee of the Chinese Communist Party.

In December 2021, Ma was appointed as the secretary of the Xinjiang Uygur Autonomous Regional Committee of the Chinese Communist Party. Since his accession to the post, Xinjiang has seen relative normalization in some aspects, such as turnstiles between residential areas being removed and two-day breaks in weekends for public officials being restored. In October 2022, Ma was elected as a member of the CCP Politburo.

References 

1959 births
Living people
Governors of Guangdong
Chinese aerospace engineers
Chinese Lunar Exploration Program
People's Republic of China politicians from Heilongjiang
Political office-holders in Guangdong
Chinese Communist Party politicians from Heilongjiang
Tianjin University alumni
Harbin Institute of Technology alumni
Academic staff of Harbin Institute of Technology
Politicians from Shuangyashan
Scientists from Heilongjiang
China National Space Administration people
Members of the 18th Central Committee of the Chinese Communist Party
Engineers from Heilongjiang
Members of the 19th Central Committee of the Chinese Communist Party
Members of the 20th Politburo of the Chinese Communist Party
Delegates to the 12th National People's Congress
Members of the 11th Chinese People's Political Consultative Conference